The South-South Nigeria Rugby Football Union (SSNRFU) is part of the Nigeria Rugby Football Federation (NRFF).

SSNRFU works in partnership with the Nigeria Rugby Football Federation (NRFF) which is the governing body for rugby union in Nigeria. The SSNRFU is built on the principles of making quality rugby football team player and providing reliable rugby game in the South-South Zone of Nigeria.

South-South Nigeria Rugby Football Union was created by the NRFF November 2013. SSNRFU is the official authorized Rugby Football Union in South-South part of Nigeria and it function solely under the Nigeria Rugby Football Federation for the purpose of youth development in six states in southern Nigeria(Edo State, Delta State, Akwa Ibom, Rivers State, Cross River State and Bayelsa State.

South-South Nigeria Rugby Football Union (SSNRFU) is authorized to expand and nurture the sport of rugby for all-encompassing age grade boys and girls in South-South Nigeria. The centre of attention is on personal wellbeing, protection, sportsmanship and the reinforcement of school children and youths by establishing the vital values of rugby into a team sports experience that will continue as long as rugby sport continue to exist.

Notable people at the SSNRFU

Chairman- Mr Henshaw Aigbehaen

Chairlady Subcommittee of Welfare (FEMALE)- Mrs Flourish Itulua-Abumere 

Chairman Subcommittee of Welfare (MALE)- Mr Michael Osabuohien Ogbemudia

10546838.websitehome.co.uk

Rugby union in Nigeria